Jack Maness is an American singer-songwriter, guitarist, and keyboardist.

Maness began his career singing and playing guitar on Sublime's "Rivers of Babylon", and later joining the Long Beach Dub Allstars as a keyboardist. He was a founding member of Dubcat and has recently released his debut solo album Simple Man featuring members of Dubcat, Slightly Stoopid,
and motown bass legend Carol Kaye. Jack's work has been licensed to Lexus auto, Procter and Gamble Bounce fabric softener, and various other medias. He has also collaborated with Reggae legend Half Pint on a track entitled "Unity" on Half Pint release entitled No Stress Express, Jack was invited to Jamaica to play at the 2007 Reggae Sumfest. Jack continues to work as a writer and collaborator on musical projects with various groups.
 2018 Jack is currently working with life long band mates from Long Beach Dub All stars be on the lookout for newly recorded material.

References

External links
 
 Skunk Records
 Jack Maness at CDBABY

Living people
Year of birth missing (living people)
American singer-songwriters
American rock songwriters
American rock singers
American acoustic guitarists
American male guitarists
American folk guitarists
American reggae guitarists
American rock guitarists
Long Beach Dub Allstars members
American male singer-songwriters